Yemeni Canadians are Canadians of Yemeni descent or Yemenis who have Canadian citizenship.

Most Yemeni Canadians speak Arabic, English or French. According to the 2016 Census there were 6,645 Canadians who claimed Yemeni ancestry.

See also

 Arab Canadians
 Yemeni Americans

References

External links 

 

Arab Canadian
Canadian